{{Infobox person
| name          = Willard Warch
| image         = 
| alt           = 
| caption       = 
| birth_name    = 
| birth_date    = 
| birth_place   = 
| death_date    = 
| death_place   = Oberlin, Ohio
| nationality   = American 
| other_names   = 
| occupation    = classical cellist, music theorist;U.S. Army Air Corps Band stationed in England
| years_active  = 
| known_for     = 
| notable_works = 'Our First 100 Years; a brief history of the Oberlin College Conservatory of Music| education     = Oberlin College
}}
Willard Franklin Warch (June 6, 1909 – October 12, 2002) was an American classical cellist and music theorist from Chicago. He was schoolmaster at Punahou School in Honolulu, first cello with the Honolulu Symphony and a Professor of Music and Theory at Oberlin College for 30 years.

Warch was a member of the Oberlin Orchestra cello section from 1927–31 and a student at Oberlin College. In 1931, he graduated, having earned both the B.Mus. and M.Mus. degrees at Oberlin. From 1942–45, Warch served in the U.S. Army Air Corps as a member of the Army Air Corps Band stationed in England. He authored five music study textbooks as well as Our First 100 Years; a brief history of the Oberlin College Conservatory of Music.''

He died in Oberlin, Ohio in 2002, aged 93.

References

External links
A picture of Warch with his cello in 1929

1909 births
2002 deaths
Musicians from Chicago
American classical cellists
American music theorists
Oberlin College alumni
Oberlin College faculty
20th-century American musicians
20th-century classical musicians
20th-century American musicologists
Classical musicians from Illinois
20th-century cellists